Donatas Slanina (born 23 April 1977) is a Lithuanian professional basketball player who plays as a shooting guard in his professional career. He also shortly worked as an assistant coach. After starting his professional career in Šiauliai, he was best known for playing in Lithuanian champion Žalgiris and Pallacanestro Reggiana. He is one of the best three point shooter in Europe.
Slanina also was member of Lithuania national team, winning gold medal in Eurobasket 2003.

Coaching career
In July 2015, Slanina was named the assistant to head coach Massimiliano Menetti, at Pallacanestro Reggiana, the club where he finished his playing career.
After the 2016-17 season, Slanina contract was not renewed by Pallacanestro Reggiana, but the Lithuanian and his family continue to live in Reggio Emilia.

Career statistics

EuroLeague

|-
| style="text-align:left;"| 2000–01
| style="text-align:left;"| Žalgiris
| 12 || 9 || 28.2 || .580 || .552 || .870 || 3.3 || 1.0 || .7 || .3 || 14.5 || 13.7
|-
| style="text-align:left;"| 2001–02
| style="text-align:left;"| Žalgiris
| 14 || 6 || 30.5 || .456 || .323 || .882 || 2.7 || 1.7 || 1.0 || .0 || 16.6 || 11.1
|-
| style="text-align:left;"| 2006–07
| style="text-align:left;"| Asseco Gdynia
| 20 || 15 || 26.0 || .547 || .337 || .896 || 1.8 || 1.5 || .8 || .1 || 10.9 || 9.2
|-
| style="text-align:left;"| 2007–08
| style="text-align:left;"| Asseco Gdynia
| 14 || 12 || 28.1 || .491 || .424 || .818 || 1.9 || 1.9 || .8 || .1 || 11.1 || 8.5

Awards and achievements

Pro clubs
Lithuanian League Champion: (2001)
Lithuanian LKL 3-Point Shootout: Champion (2001)
2× Polish League Champion: (2007, 2008)
Polish League Finals MVP: (2007)

Lithuanian senior national team
EuroBasket 2003:

References

External links 
Euroleague.net Profile
Eurobasket.com Profile
Italian League Profile  Retrieved 2 September 2015
RealGM Profile Retrieved 2 September 2015

1977 births
Living people
Asseco Gdynia players
Basketball players at the 2004 Summer Olympics
BC Šiauliai players
BC Žalgiris players
CB Murcia players
FIBA EuroBasket-winning players
Lega Basket Serie A players
Liga ACB players
Lithuanian expatriate basketball people in Italy
Lithuanian expatriate basketball people in Poland
Lithuanian expatriate basketball people in Spain
Lithuanian men's basketball players
Olympic basketball players of Lithuania
Pallacanestro Reggiana players
Real Betis Baloncesto players
Shooting guards
Sportspeople from Šiauliai
Trefl Sopot players